Thomas Hayes Campbell (May 15, 1815 – November 22, 1862) was an American politician.

Born in Hartstown, Pennsylvania, Campbell moved with his family to Illinois and eventually settled in Springfield, Illinois. From 1842 to 1857, Campbell served as the Auditor of Public Accounts, State of Illinois. During the American Civil War, Campbell helped with the auditing of accounts of the Illinois state government. Campbell died in Springfield, Illinois, from asthma.

Notes

External links

1815 births
1862 deaths
People from Crawford County, Pennsylvania
Politicians from Springfield, Illinois
People of Illinois in the American Civil War
Auditors of Public Accounts of Illinois
Respiratory disease deaths in Illinois
Deaths from asthma